Powerlifting at the 2008 Summer Paralympics was held in the Beihang University Gymnasium from September 9 to September 16. Any athlete who met a minimum level of disability (as determined by the IPC Powerlifting Classification Committee) could take part in these events.

Events
There were twenty powerlifting events, corresponding to ten weight classes each for men and women.

Participating countries
There were 203 athletes (121 male, 82 female) from 74 nations taking part in this sport.

Medal summary

Medal table

This ranking sorts countries by the number of gold medals earned by their powerlifters (in this context a country is an entity represented by a National Paralympic Committee). The number of silver medals is taken into consideration next and then the number of bronze medals. If, after the above, countries are still tied, equal ranking is given and they are listed alphabetically.

Women's events

Men's events

References

External links
Official site of the 2008 Summer Paralympics

 
2008 Summer Paralympics events
Paralympics